Glenn Johnstone is an English former footballer who played as a goalkeeper. He played in The Football League for Preston North End during the 1992–93 season. He was signed from Lancaster City and later left Preston for Morecambe.

Personal life
He is the father of Crystal Palace  goalkeeper Sam Johnstone.

References

Living people
Association football goalkeepers
Lancaster City F.C. players
Preston North End F.C. players
Morecambe F.C. players
English Football League players
Year of birth missing (living people)
English footballers